The Piesting is a river in southern Lower Austria.

These rivers meet in Gutenstein in the Vienna Woods. From there the Piesting flows east through Markt Piesting and Wöllersdorf and into the Viennese Basin.

The tributary Myrabach discharges at Pernitz into the Piesting. Near Gramatneusiedl the Piesting discharges into the Fischa.

See also
 Markt Piesting

References

Rivers of Lower Austria
Wiener Neustadt-Land District
Gutenstein Alps
Rivers of Austria